Alfrēds Birznieks (13 February 1889 – 28 April 1942) was a Latvian politician and lawyer. He was the acting Minister of the Interior of the Republic of Latvia from 6 September 1919 to 8 December 1919, and the Minister of the Interior from 20 June 1923 to 8 May 1924.

After the Soviet occupation of Baltic states he was imprisoned in Usollag forced labor camp, was sentenced to death there, but died before the execution.

References 

1889 births
1942 deaths
People from Dobele Municipality
People from Courland Governorate
Democratic Centre (Latvia) politicians
Ministers of the Interior of Latvia
Deputies of the 1st Saeima
20th-century Latvian lawyers
Moscow State University alumni
Latvian people executed by the Soviet Union